The Fox–Worswick House, also known as the E. A. Worswick Home, located at 119 E. Bullion St. in Hailey, Idaho, United States is a historic house whose original structure was a log cabin built in 1881 when Hailey was founded.  The property was bought for $25 by Dr. C. B. Fox from John Hailey;  it was sold six times before 1919.  The log cabin has since been expanded but an interior log wall remains.  The house was restored to a turn-of-the-20th-century style by the Wood River Land Trust, owners since 2000.

It was listed on the National Register of Historic Places in 2011.

References

Houses on the National Register of Historic Places in Idaho
Houses completed in 1881
Houses in Blaine County, Idaho
National Register of Historic Places in Blaine County, Idaho
1881 establishments in Idaho Territory